Crosbyton is a city in and the county seat of Crosby County, Texas, United States. The population was 1,741 at the 2010 census. Crosbyton is part of the Lubbock Metropolitan Statistical Area.

History
The city was named for land office commissioner Stephen Crosby.

Geography 

US 82 leads east  to Dickens and west  to Lubbock.

Demographics

2020 census

As of the 2020 United States census, there were 1,492 people, 667 households, and 498 families residing in the city.

2000 census
As of the census of 2000,  1,874 people, 677 households, and 482 families resided in the city. The population density was 886.9 people per square mile (342.9/km). The 781 housing units averaged 369.6 per square mile (142.9/km). The racial makeup of the city was 62.49% White, 5.71% African American, 0.21% Native American, 0.05% Asian, 30.15% from other races, and 1.39% from two or more races. Hispanics or Latinos of any race were 47.65% of the population.

Of the 677 households, 34.6% had children under the age of 18 living with them, 55.8% were married couples living together, 11.1% had a female householder with no husband present, and 28.8% were not families. About 27.3% of all households were made up of individuals, and 17.6% had someone living alone who was 65 years of age or older. The average household size was 2.68 and the average family size was 3.26.

In the city, the population was distributed as 28.8% under the age of 18, 8.8% from 18 to 24, 24.3% from 25 to 44, 20.8% from 45 to 64, and 17.4% who were 65 years of age or older. The median age was 36 years. For every 100 females, there were 85.9 males. For every 100 females age 18 and over, there were 82.4 males.

The median income for a household in the city was $24,722, and for a family was $30,900. Males had a median income of $22,647 versus $18,000 for females. The per capita income for the city was $16,329. About 23.7% of families and 28.0% of the population were below the poverty line, including 36.9% of those under age 18 and 25.9% of those age 65 or over.

Government
Former Crosby County Administrative County Judge Joseph P. Heflin represented District 85 in the Texas House of Representatives from 2007 to 2011. During his tenure, Heflin was the only Democrat from either West Texas or the Panhandle serving in the legislature. He was unseated in the 2010 general election by the Republican Jim Landtroop of Plainview in Hale County. In 2006, Heflin had defeated Landtroop by fewer than 225 votes.

Education
The city is served by the Crosbyton Consolidated Independent School District.

Climate
Crosbyton gets about 23 inches of rain each year. As a comparison, the US average is 39 inches. Snowfall averages 7 inches compared to the US city average of 26 inches of snow. The city receives some measurable precipitation about 40 days a year.

Sunny weather typically occurs 263 days. The Sperling comfort index for Crosbyton is 62 out of 100 (the higher score indicates a more comfortable year-round climate.

Notable people

 Randy Crouch, Oklahoma Music Awards: 2004 Fiddler Of The Year, 2005 Red Dirt Hall of Fame, and 2006 Steel Guitarist Of The Year
 Don Maynard. member of the Pro Football Hall of Fame

See also

 White River (Texas)

References

External links
City of Crosbyton official website

Cities in Texas
Cities in Crosby County, Texas
County seats in Texas
Lubbock metropolitan area